Robert Travers may refer to:

 Robert Travers (cricketer) (born 1982), English cricketer
 Robert Travers (bishop), Bishop of Leighlin
 Robert Travers (MP) (c. 1596–1647), Irish judge, soldier and politician
 R. Travers Herford (1860–1950), British Unitarian minister and scholar